Édouard Collin (born 28 February 1987) is a French actor.

Theater

Filmography

References

External links 

More information can be found on the Francophone website: EdouardCollin.com

1987 births
Living people
21st-century French male actors
French male television actors
French male film actors